The Cal Poly Pomona Broncos college football team represented California State University, Los Angeles from 1947–1982. The Broncos competed in the National Collegiate Athletic Association (NCAA) College Division and its successor, Division II.

The program had 11 different head coaches in its 36 seasons of existence, including one who had multiple tenures as coach.

Coaches

References 

Cal Poly Pomona Broncos

Cal Poly Pomona Broncos football